The following is an overview of the events of 1891 in film, including a list of films released and notable births.

Events
William K. L. Dickson, an assistant to Thomas Edison, supervises the construction of the first film studio, the Black Maria, in West Orange, New Jersey which produces many of the early Kinetoscope short films of the 1890s later seen in penny arcades the following year after the studio is completed.
 March – William K. L. Dickson successfully develops a working prototype of the Kinetoscope which moves horizontally.
 May 20 – First public display of Thomas Edison's prototype horizontal kinetoscope: Dickson Greeting is shown at Edison's Laboratory for a convention of the National Federation of Women's Clubs in West Orange, New Jersey.
 August 24 – Thomas Edison files for a patent for the motion picture camera (which he receives in 1897).

Films released in 1891

Dickson Greeting, starring and directed by William K. L. Dickson.
Duncan and Another, Blacksmith Shop, directed by William K. L. Dickson and William Heise and starring James C. Duncan.
Duncan Smoking, directed by William K. L. Dickson and William Heise and starring James C. Duncan.
Duncan or Devonald with Muslin Cloud, directed by William K. L. Dickson and William Heise and starring Fred C. Devonald and James C. Duncan.
Men Boxing, directed by William K. L. Dickson and William Heise.
Monkey and Another, Boxing, directed by William K. L. Dickson and William Heise.
Newark Athlete, directed by William K. L. Dickson.
Je vous aime, starring and directed by Georges Demenÿ.
La vague, directed by Étienne-Jules Marey.
Two Fencers, directed by Étienne-Jules Marey.

Births

External links

 1891  at the Internet Movie Database

 
Film by year
Articles containing video clips

fr:Avant 1895 au cinéma